The Helite Tsunami is a French high-wing, single-place, rigid-wing hang glider that was designed by	Gérard Thevenot and produced by La Mouette under the Helite brand.

Design and development
The Tsunami was developed from the La Mouette Top Secret as a rigid wing competition hang glider. Thevenot decided to market it under his Helite brand which was also used for a line of powered parachutes. Available c. 2003, the aircraft is now out of production and the brand is no longer used.

The aircraft is made from tubing, with the wing covered in Dacron sailcloth. Its  area wing is a "topless" design with no kingpost. The nose angle is 145°.

Operational history
The Tsunami won a number of hang gliding championships in the rigid wing class.

Specifications

References

Helite Tsunami
Hang gliders